Rene Swette (born August 21, 1988) is an Austrian professional ice hockey goaltender who is currently playing for HC TWK Innsbruck of the ICE Hockey League (ICEHL). He participated at the 2011 IIHF World Championship as a member of the Austria men's national ice hockey team.

References

External links

1988 births
Austrian ice hockey goaltenders
EHC Black Wings Linz players
Dresdner Eislöwen players
EC KAC players
Living people
EHC Lustenau players
People from Lustenau
Ice hockey players at the 2014 Winter Olympics
Olympic ice hockey players of Austria
HC TWK Innsbruck players
EC VSV players
Sportspeople from Vorarlberg